The Three from the Filling Station (German: Die Drei von der Tankstelle) is a 1930 German musical film directed by Wilhelm Thiele and starring Lilian Harvey, Willy Fritsch, Heinz Rühmann, and Oskar Karlweis. Produced by Erich Pommer, the film was a major success for the UFA studio, outgrossing even The Blue Angel. Several songs composed by Werner R. Heymann and performed by the Comedian Harmonists have remained popular up to today. The film also had a heavy influence on Hollywood musicals during the 1930s.

Plot summary
Completely broke, the three friends Willy, Kurt and Hans strand on a country road when they run out of fuel. They sell their car to acquire a nearby filling station. Taking turns at serving as petrol attendants the three independently of one another fall in love with the handsome and well-off customer Lilian, anxiously hiding their romance with each other. However, the young women only reciprocates Willy's feelings and invites him and his friends to a luxury restaurant in order to establish clarity. When Willy learns about his luck, he immediately renunciates his victory out of deference to his friends.

To establish close ties, Lilian asks her father to found a petrol company and to employ Willy as managing-director. The young man attaches his consent to the recruitment of his friends. When Lilian proceeds to become his secretary, infuriated Willy dictates his dismissal notice which he promptly signs without further reading – and realises that in fact he has subscribed a marriage contract with Lilian.

Other versions
A French-language version Le chemin du paradis was produced by UFA simultaneously, with Henri Garat taking Fritsch's part and Harvey reprising her own role (she was fluent in three languages).

A remake of the film The Three from the Filling Station starring Germaine Damar, Adrian Hoven, Walter Müller, and Walter Giller was released in 1955. Willy Fritsch again appeared, this time performing as Lilian's father.

Cast
 Lilian Harvey as Lilian Cossmann
 Willy Fritsch as Willy
 Heinz Rühmann as Hans
 Oskar Karlweis as Kurt
 Fritz Kampers as Konsul Cossmann
 Olga Tschechowa as Edith von Turkow
 Kurt Gerron as Doctor Kalmus
 Gertrud Wolle as Doctor Kalmus' Secretary
 Felix Bressart as the Bailiff 
The following musicians also make guest appearances in the film:
 Leo Monosson 
 Comedian Harmonists
 Lewis Ruth Band

References

Bibliography
 Hardt, Ursula. From Caligari to California: Erich Pommer's Life in the International Film Wars. Berghahn Books, 1996.

External links

1930 films
1930 musical comedy films
German musical comedy films
Films of the Weimar Republic
1930s German-language films
Films directed by Wilhelm Thiele
German multilingual films
Films set in Berlin
UFA GmbH films
Films produced by Erich Pommer
Films with screenplays by Franz Schulz
German black-and-white films
1930 multilingual films
1930s German films